Pusic may refer to:

 PUSIC, the Party for Unity and Safeguarding of the Integrity of Congo
 Pusić, a Croatian surname
 Pušić, a Croatian surname